Association football (also known as soccer) is the most popular sport in almost all African countries, and in 2010 South Africa became the first African nation to host the FIFA World Cup.

Some African nations, like Kenya and Ethiopia, are very dominant at long distance running, whilst north African countries such Algeria, Egypt, Morocco and Tunisia are dominant in handball.  Rugby and golf are reasonably popular in a few African countries, though rugby is very popular in South Africa.

History 
Sport in Africa before the mid-twentieth century was primarily played by Europeans. This was used to further the division between the social classes of both races. General physical education was implemented within the urban areas of African colonies to "civilize" and improve the productivity of African natives. As the offspring of the European elites and indigenous natives pursued education, they became introduced to the sports that had been previously reserved to the European settlers. There, many of them excelled and became "African Sport Stars" and were revered for their excellent performances. Those athletes would be included in the British and French national teams as there was a potential to their athletic prowess. From then on, the colonized African colonies were represented on the international sports scene. The elite athletes in the Anglophone and Francophone African colonies were called the "noble savages." They often were children of Senegalese tirailleurs or military men. 

After World War II, and the reconstruction era of European borders, Britain and France found it difficult to keep their colonies, especially with growing nationalism. After the League of Nations was created, Britain and France committed to the principles of good government, which stated the people have a right to determine their own form of government. Preceding the end of World War II, Africa took initiative to become independent of the neocolonial guardianship created by Britain and France. The internationalization of African sport depended heavily on the decolonization movements, alongside the integration into the Olympics. Africa utilized sports as a way to fight against apartheid and end racial discrimination by social status. As the "noble savages" gained popularity, African elites seized this opportunity to not only fight apartheid and develop African sports, but to also carve an image of a new independent Africa. 

In 1956, football boomed in Africa with the establishment of the Confederation of African Football. Pan-Africanism was expressed through sports, but were conditioned by Western sporting federations like FIFA. Nevertheless, in the 1960 Rome Olympics, black African sportsmen were very successful in their respective fields, even scoring high places at the end of the competition. Sports furthered Africa's quest for independence, and today Africa is renowned in many sports, especially in soccer.

Infrastructure

African relative lack of success in international sports is due to lack of infrastructure.

Team sports

Basketball

Basketball is also popular throughout the continent, with notable results in Nigeria, Tunisia, Egypt, Senegal, Ivory Coast, Cameroon and Angola, recently too in Cape Verde and South Sudan.

The Nigerian Hakeem Olajuwon (2x times NBA Champion with Houston Rockets) is one of the best foreign players in the NBA's history and considered fundamental in developing and popularizing Basketball in Africa.

Cricket
Cricket is a popular summer sport in the United Kingdom and has been exported to other parts of the former British Empire.  Cricket has its origins in south east Britain. It is popular throughout England and Wales, and parts of the Netherlands, and in other world areas, especially in southern Africa, Australia, New Zealand and the Indian subcontinent. It is played to test cricket level in South Africa and Zimbabwe, with notable results in Kenya and Namibia.

Field Hockey
Field Hockey is popular throughout the former regions of the British Empire in Africa, with notable results in Egypt, Nigeria, Ghana, Kenya, Namibia, Botswana, Zimbabwe and especially South Africa.

Football

Association football (also known as soccer) is the most popular sport in almost all African countries. African club teams compete in the CAF Champions League and CAF Confederation Cup. African national teams compete in the Africa Cup of Nations and also in the African Nations Championship for local teams.

Ice hockey

Ice hockey is a minority sport in Africa, in which only a handful of African countries participate.

Rugby union
Rugby union is very popular in South Africa (3x times World Champions in 1995, 2007 & 2019) and other countries have notable results such as Morocco, Namibia, Zimbabwe and Ivory Coast. The major competition in the continent is the Africa Cup that contains the teams in the first level of African rugby, and African Development Trophy contains the teams in the second level. Only the South Africa rugby team compete in the intercontinental tournament, The Rugby Championship. Albert Grundlingh’s article discusses the affects that a sport had on nationalism, specifically how rugby shaped the Afrikaner identity to some extent. The university of Stellenbosch was described as the “mecca” for south African rugby was a counter to English speaking universities by illuminating  “the root of Afrikandom”.

Other sports
Handball and volleyball are popular especially in North Africa, Other team sports like water polo, roller hockey and netball are also popular in some Eastern and Southern countries from Africa.

Individual sports
Individual sports are also very important. Africa has a major multisports competition called All-Africa Games that started in 1965 held in Brazzaville, Republic of the Congo.

Athletics
Athletics is one of the major single competitions in Africa. The discipline has been part of the African Games since 1965. The African Athletics Championships has been held biannually since 1979. The African Cross Country Championships was first held in 1985 and later since 2011. The African Mountain Running Championships has been held since 2009.

In addition, several editions of the IAAF World Cross Country Championships have been held in Africa. The Meeting International Mohammed VI d'Athlétisme de Rabat has been held at Morocco since 2008 as part of the IAAF World Challenge and the IAAF Diamond League. Previously, the Meeting Grand Prix IAAF de Dakar was part of the IAAF Grand Prix and IAAF World Challenge. The Cape Town Marathon became an IAAF Silver Label event in 2014 and an IAAF Gold Label event in 2017.

Kenya and Ethiopia have been dominant in athletics at the Summer Olympics since the 1960s, especially in mid-distance and long-distance running.

Cycling
The UCI Africa Tour road cycling competition has been held since 2005.

The Dimension Data, formerly MTN–Qhubeka, was the first African team to enter the Grand Tours in 2015. Notable team members include Jacques Janse van Rensburg and Youcef Reguigui.

Kenya and Rwanda are rising forces in world cycling.

Golf
Golf is a minority sport in Africa. The Sunshine Tour is based in South Africa but also visits other neighbour countries. Several tournaments have been co-sanctioned by the European Tour, such as the South African Open, South African PGA Championship, Alfred Dunhill Championship, Nedbank Golf Challenge, Africa Open, Joburg Open, Tshwane Open,

Notable African golfers include Bobby Locke, winner of The British Open four times in 1949, 1950, 1952 and 1957; Gary Player, winner of the British Open in 1959, 1968 and 1974, The Masters in 1961, 1974 and 1978, the PGA Championship in 1962 and 1972 and the U.S Open in 1965; Ernie Els, winner of the 1994, 1997 U.S. Open and 2002 British Open; Nick Price, winner of the 1992 and 1994 PGA Championship and 1994 British Open; Retief Goosen; Trevor Immelman; Louis Oosthuizen and Charl Schwartzel.

Tennis

Tennis is minority sport in Africa.

Motorsport

Motorsport is popular in South Africa. The country has hosted several international races, such as the South African Grand Prix (Formula One), South African motorcycle Grand Prix (Grand Prix motorcycle racing), etc. The Moroccan Grand Prix was the first Grand Prix from Africa to host the Formula 1 in 1958. 

Jody Scheckter is the only Auto driver from Africa to win the Formula 1 in 1979. In Motos, South Africa had/has notable riders such as Kork Ballington, Jon Ekerold, and currently, Brad Binder.

Combat sports
There are also major martial arts and combat sport competitions in the continent.

Boxing

Louis Phal was the first African world boxing champion. It would another 4 decades for another boxing world champion in the form of Richard Ihetu. Meanwhile, there was little administrative framework for professional boxing in Africa until 1973, when representatives of nine African nations created the African Boxing Union. On October 30, 1974, Muhammad Ali and George Foreman fought for a heavyweight title in Zaire which became known as Rumble in the Jungle.

Africa has produced many world champions, with Azumah Nelson the most well known.

Judo
Africa has yet to produce a winner in world judo. African Judo Championships is the most important judo event in Africa.

Karate
Karate was first introduced in Africa in the 1960s. The Union of African Karate Federation is in charge of karate in Africa.

Mixed martial arts
Notable African mixed martial artists include UFC middleweight champion Israel Adesanya, UFC welterweight champion Kamaru Usman, and UFC heavyweight champion Francis Ngannou.

Extreme Fighting Championship (formerly known as EFC Africa) is a South African promotion founded in 2009. It is the number one mixed martial arts organisation in the African continent.

EFC Africa 19, which was held at Carnival City in Johannesburg on 19 April 2013, topped other African sports ratings with a record of over 1.8 million views with 31.3% of the total South African TV audience (SABC, e.tv and DStv combined). These are the biggest ratings in EFC history, topping EFC Africa 12's record of 1.6 million views and 25.9% audience share. EFC 85 has been postponed because of the COVID-19 pandemic.

Taekwondo
Taekwondo is growing as more people compete in the Olympics. Africa is emerging as a powerhouse in Taekwondo. Taekwondo is run by the African Taekwondo Union.

Winter Olympics

Many people of the African diaspora represent African nations at the Winter Olympics.

Events
South Africa has hosted the 1995 Rugby World Cup, 2003 Cricket World Cup and 2010 FIFA World Cup.  Africa has hosted six editions of the Pan Arab Games and five editions of the Mediterranean Games. Durban, South Africa was announced as host of the 2022 Commonwealth Games in 2015, but they were denied as hosts in 2017.

Notable continental tournaments are the African Games, Africa Cup of Nations, CAF Champions League, African Championships in Athletics, African Rally Championship and Sunshine Tour.

See also

 Africa Military Games
 African Sports Confederation of Disabled
 African Youth Games
 Association of African Sports Confederations
 Association of National Olympic Committees of Africa
 List of African Olympic medalists
 Sport in Asia
 Sport in Europe
 Sport in Oceania
 Sport in South America
 Sports in North America

Bibliography
Bogopa, D. (2001). ”Sports Development: Obstacles and solutions in South Africa”. In The African Anthropologist, vol. 8, No. 1.
Chiweshe, M. K. (2014). “The problem with African Football:Corruption, and the (under)development of the game on the continent”.  In African Sports Law and Business Bulletin/2014.
Keim, M. and de Coning, C. (ed.) (2014).Sports and Development Policy in Africa: Results of a Collaborate Study of Selected Country Cases. Cape Town: Interdisciplinary Centre of Excellence for Sports Science and Development (ICESSD), University of Western Cape.
Mwisukha, A. and Mabagala, S. (2011). “Governance challenges in sports in East Africa”. Unpublished paper presented at the international conference of the African Sports Management Association held on 2–4 December 2011, Kampala, Uganda. Available from http://ir-library.ku.ac.ke/handle/123456789/13541.
Pannenborg, A. (2010): “Football in Africa: Observations about political, financial, cultural and religious influences”, NCDO Publication Series Sports& Development.
Steiner, A (2008) “Challenges of sports development in Ghana”, 27 October 2008. Available from https://www.modernghana.com/news/188252/challenges-of-sports-development-in-ghana.html.

References